Safia Salih (born 16 March 2001) is a Moroccan taekwondo practitioner. She represented Morocco at the 2019 African Games held in Rabat, Morocco and she won the gold medal in the women's 62 kg event.

At the 2018 Summer Youth Olympics held in Buenos Aires, Argentina, she won the silver medal in the 55 kg event. In 2019, she competed in the women's lightweight event at the World Taekwondo Championships where she was eliminated by Anna-Lena Frömming in her first match.

She competed in the women's 67 kg event at the 2022 Mediterranean Games held in Oran, Algeria. She was eliminated in her second match by eventual bronze medalist Magda Wiet-Hénin of France.

She competed in the women's lightweight event at the 2022 World Taekwondo Championships held in Guadalajara, Mexico.

References

External links 
 

Living people
2001 births
Place of birth missing (living people)
Moroccan female taekwondo practitioners
Taekwondo practitioners at the 2018 Summer Youth Olympics
Competitors at the 2019 African Games
African Games medalists in taekwondo
African Games gold medalists for Morocco
Competitors at the 2022 Mediterranean Games
Mediterranean Games competitors for Morocco
Islamic Solidarity Games medalists in taekwondo
Islamic Solidarity Games competitors for Morocco
21st-century Moroccan women